The Cova da Beira University Hospital Center (CHUCB - Centro Hospitalar Universitário Cova da Beira) is a Portuguese state-run hospital center in the Cova da Beira subregion. It has the role of teaching hospital of the University of Beira Interior, and is composed by two autonomous hospitals located in the neighbouring cities of Covilhã (Hospital Pêro da Covilhã), established in June 1908, and Fundão (Hospital do Fundão), established on October 16, 1955.

References

Hospitals in Portugal
Medical education in Portugal
Teaching hospitals
Hospitals established in 1908
Hospitals established in 1955
Buildings and structures in Castelo Branco District
Buildings and structures in Covilhã